Woodrooffe is a surname. Notable people with the surname include:

Anne Woodrooffe (1766–?), 19th-century British author
Thomas Woodrooffe (1899–1978), British naval officer, broadcaster, and writer

See also
 Woodroffe
 Woodroofe (surname)